Operation Guidance was an Australian-British raid during World War II in 1944.

The British X-class submarine , entered Bergen harbour in German-occupied Norway on a mission to sink a large floating dock. After being detected and shaking off their pursuer, X24 made it to the target area, but faulty intelligence and incorrect charts led them to lay their charges not on the floating dock, but on a large German ship nearby, which was sunk in the explosion.

References

1944 in Norway
Conflicts in 1944
Naval battles and operations of World War II involving the United Kingdom
Military operations of World War II involving Germany
World War II raids
20th century in Bergen